The mathematical operations of multiplication have several applications to music. Other than its application to the frequency ratios of intervals (for example, Just intonation, and the twelfth root of two in equal temperament), it has been used in other ways for twelve-tone technique, and musical set theory. Additionally ring modulation is an electrical audio process involving multiplication that has been used for musical effect.

A multiplicative operation is a mapping in which the argument is multiplied. Multiplication originated intuitively in interval expansion, including tone row order number rotation, for example in the music of Béla Bartók and Alban Berg. Pitch number rotation, Fünferreihe or "five-series" and Siebenerreihe or "seven-series", was first described by Ernst Krenek in Über neue Musik. Princeton-based theorists, including James K. Randall, Godfrey Winham, and Hubert S. Howe "were the first to discuss and adopt them, not only with regards  to twelve-tone series".

Pitch-class multiplication modulo 12 

When dealing with pitch-class sets, multiplication modulo 12 is a common operation. Dealing with all twelve tones, or a tone row, there are only a few numbers which one may multiply a row by and still end up with a set of twelve distinct tones. Taking the prime or unaltered form as P0, multiplication is indicated by Mx, x being the multiplicator:
 Mx(y) ≡ xy mod 12

The following table lists all possible multiplications of a chromatic twelve-tone row:

Note that only M1, M5, M7, and M11 give a one-to-one mapping (a complete set of 12 unique tones). This is because each of these numbers is relatively prime to 12. Also interesting is that the chromatic scale is mapped to the circle of fourths with M5, or fifths with M7, and more generally under M7 all even numbers stay the same while odd numbers are transposed by a tritone. This kind of multiplication is frequently combined with a transposition operation. It was first described in print by Herbert Eimert, under the terms "Quartverwandlung" (fourth transformation) and "Quintverwandlung" (fifth transformation),, and has been used by the composers Milton Babbitt, Robert Morris, and Charles Wuorinen. This operation also accounts for certain harmonic transformations in jazz.

Thus multiplication by the two meaningful operations (5 & 7) may be designated with M5(a) and M7(a) or M and IM.

M1 = Identity
M5 = Cycle of fourths transform
M7 = Cycle of fifths transform
M11 = Inversion
M11M5 = M7
M7M5 = M11
M5M5 = M1
M7M11M5 = M1
...

Pitch multiplication 

Pierre Boulez described an operation he called pitch multiplication, which is somewhat akin  to the Cartesian product of pitch-class sets. Given two sets, the result of pitch multiplication will be the set of sums (modulo 12) of all possible pairings of elements between the original two sets. Its definition:

For example, if multiplying a C-major chord  with a dyad containing C,D , the result is:

In this example, a set of three pitches multiplied with a set of two pitches gives a new set of 3 × 2 pitches. Given the limited space of modulo 12 arithmetic, when using this procedure very often duplicate tones are produced, which are generally omitted. This technique was used most famously in Boulez's 1955 Le Marteau sans maître, as well as in his Third Piano Sonata, Structures II, "Don" and "Tombeau" from Pli selon pli, Eclat (and Eclat multiples), Figures—Doubles—Prismes, Domaines, and Cummings ist der Dichter, as well as the withdrawn choral work, Oubli signal lapidé (1952). This operation, unlike arithmetic multiplication and transpositional combination of set classes, is non-commutative.

Howard Hanson called this operation of commutative mathematical convolution "superposition" or "@-projection" and used the "/" notation interchangeably. Thus "p@m" or "p/m" means "perfect fifth at major third", e.g.: { C E G B }. He specifically noted that two triad forms could be so multiplied, or a triad multiplied by itself, to produce a resultant scale. The latter "squaring" of a triad produces a particular scale highly saturated in instances of the source triad. Thus "pmn", Hanson's name for common the major triad, when squared, is "PMN", e.g.: { C D E G G B }.

Nicolas Slonimsky used this operation, non-generalized, to form 1300 scales by multiplying the symmetric tritones, augmented chords, diminished seventh chords, and wholetone scales by the sum of 3 factors which he called interpolation, infrapolation, and ultrapolation. The combination of interpolation, infrapolation, and ultrapolation, forming obliquely infra-interpolation, infra-ultrapolation, and infra-inter-ultrapolation, additively sums to what is effectively a second sonority. This second sonority, multiplied by the first, gives his formula for generating scales and their harmonizations.

Joseph Schillinger used the idea, undeveloped, to categorize common 19th- and early 20th-century harmonic styles as product of horizontal harmonic root-motion and vertical harmonic structure. Some of the composers' styles which he cites appear in the following multiplication table.

The approximation of the 12 pitches of Western music by modulus-12 math, forming the Circle of Halfsteps, means that musical intervals can also be thought of as angles in a polar coordinate system, stacking of identical intervals as functions of harmonic motion, and transposition as rotation around an axis. Thus, in the multiplication example above from Hanson, "p@m" or "p/m" ("perfect 5th at major 3rd", e.g.: { C E G B }) also means "perfect fifth, superimposed upon perfect fifth rotated 1/3 of the circumference of the Circle of Halfsteps". A conversion table of intervals to angular measure (taken as negative numbers for clockwise rotation) follows:

This angular interpretation of intervals is helpful to visualize a very practical example of multiplication in music: Euler-Fokker genera used in describing the Just intonation tuning of keyboard instruments. Each genus represents an harmonic function such as "3 perfect fifths stacked" or other sonority such as { C G D F }, which, when multiplied by the correct angle(s) of copy, approximately fills the 12TET circumferential space of the Circle of fifths. It would be possible, though not musically pretty, to tune an augmented triad of two perfect non-beating major thirds, then (multiplying) tune two tempered fifths above and 1 below each note of the augmented chord; this is Euler-Fokker genus [555]. A different result is obtained by starting with the "3 perfect fifths stacked", and from these non-beating notes tuning a tempered major third above and below; this is Euler-Fokker genus [333].

Time multiplication
Joseph Schillinger described an operation of "polynomial time multiplication" (polynomial refers to any rhythm consisting of more than one duration) corresponding roughly to that of Pitch multiplication above. A theme, reduced to a consistent series of integers representing the quarter, 8th-, or 16th-note duration of each of the notes of the theme, could be multiplied by itself or the series of another theme to produce a coherent and related variation. Especially, a theme's series could be squared or cubed or taken to higher powers to produce a saturation of related material.

Affine transformation

Herbert Eimert described what he called the "eight modes" of the twelve-tone series, all mirror forms of one another. The inverse is obtained through a horizontal mirror, the retrograde through a vertical mirror, the retrograde-inverse through both a horizontal and a vertical mirror, and the "cycle-of-fourths-transform" or Quartverwandlung and "cycle-of-fifths-transform" or Quintverwandlung obtained through a slanting mirror. With the retrogrades of these transforms and the prime, there are eight permutations.

Joseph Schillinger embraced not only contrapuntal inverse, retrograde, and retrograde-inverse—operations of matrix multiplication in Euclidean vector space—but also their rhythmic counterparts as well. Thus he could describe a variation of theme using the same pitches in same order, but employing its original time values in retrograde order. He saw the scope of this multiplicatory universe beyond simple reflection, to include transposition and rotation (possibly with projection back to source), as well as dilation which had formerly been limited in use to the time dimension (via augmentation and diminution). Thus he could describe another variation of theme, or even of a basic scale, by multiplying the halfstep counts between each successive pair of notes by some factor, possibly normalizing to the octave via Modulo-12 operation,(

Z-relation
Some Z-related chords are connected by M or IM (multiplication by 5 or multiplication by 7), due to identical entries for 1 and 5 on the APIC vector.

References 

Sources

Further reading 

 Losada, Catherine C. 2014. "Complex Multiplication, Structure, and Process: Harmony and Form in Boulez’s Structures II". Music Theory Spectrum 36, no. 1 (Spring): 86–120.
 Morris, Robert D. 1977. "On the Generation of Multiple-Order-Function Twelve-Tone Rows". Journal of Music Theory 21, no. 2 (Autumn): 238–262.
 Morris, Robert D. 1982–83. "Combinatoriality without the Aggregate". Perspectives of New Music 21, nos. 1 & 2 (Autumn-Winter/Spring-Summer): 432–486.
 Morris, Robert D. 1990. "Pitch-Class Complementation and Its Generalizations". Journal of Music Theory 34, no. 2 (Autumn): 175–245.
 Starr, Daniel V. 1978. "Sets, Invariance, and Partitions." Journal of Music Theory 22, no. 1:1–42.

Musical techniques
Mathematics of music